Mariano Pérez (8 October 1948 – 27 December 2016) was a Spanish boxer. He competed in the men's light welterweight event at the 1968 Summer Olympics.

References

1948 births
2016 deaths
Spanish male boxers
Olympic boxers of Spain
Boxers at the 1968 Summer Olympics
Sportspeople from Melilla
Mediterranean Games bronze medalists for Spain
Mediterranean Games medalists in boxing
Competitors at the 1967 Mediterranean Games
Light-welterweight boxers
20th-century Spanish people
21st-century Spanish people